The 2022 Grand Prix de Fourmies was the 89th edition of the Grand Prix de Fourmies, a one-day road cycling race in and around Fourmies in northern France. It was also the fifteenth event of the 2022 French Road Cycling Cup.

Teams 
Eleven of the eighteen UCI WorldTeams, seven UCI ProTeams, and five UCI Continental teams made up the twenty-three teams that participated in the race. All teams fielded a full squad of seven riders.

UCI WorldTeams

 
 
 
 
 
 
 
 
 
 
 

UCI ProTeams

 
 
 
 
 
 
 

UCI Continental Teams

Result

References

Sources

External links 
 

2022
Grand Prix de Fourmies
Grand Prix de Fourmies
Grand Prix de Fourmies